Queensgate, Queen's Gate and variants may refer to:

Locations and structures
Canada
Queensgate, a suburb of Caledon, Ontario
Queen's Gates, ornate entrance to the Canadian parliament

Gibraltar
Queen's Gate, Gibraltar, an ancient city gate

New Zealand
Queensgate shopping centre in Lower Hutt, Wellington

United Kingdom
Queensgate shopping centre in Peterborough, Cambridgeshire
Queen's Gate, a street in South Kensington, London
Queen's Gate School, a girls' school in South Kensington, London
Queensgate housing estate in Stockton-on-Tees

United States
Queensgate, Cincinnati, Ohio, neighbourhood
Queens Gate, Pennsylvania
Tyler Run-Queens Gate, Pennsylvania, a CDP in York County

Other
Queen's Gate (gamebook), a Japanese visual combat series
Queen's Gate (poetry collection), a poetry collection by Pia Tafdrup
Queensgate, a fictional ruined castle from the A Song of Ice and Fire series by George R. R. Martin